Prestoniella is a genus of very small sea snails, pyramidellid gastropod mollusks or micromollusks. This genus is currently placed in the subfamily Chrysallidinae within the family Odostomiidae.

Shell description
The original description by Laseron (1958) (in French) is extremely short and only states that the base of the shell is without spiral ribs.

Life history
Nothing is known about the biology of the members of this genus. As is true of most members of the Pyramidellidae sensu lato, they are most likely to be ectoparasites.

Species
Species within the genus Prestoniella include:
 Prestoniella prestoni (Dautzenberg & Fischer, 1906) (Type species) (as Pyrgulina prestoni)
 Prestoniella lamyi (Dautzenberg & Fischer, 1906)
 Prestoniella affectuosa (Yokoyama, 1927)
 Prestoniella orientalis (Nomura, 1936)

References
 

Pyramidellidae

de:Pyramidelloidea